Juniperus angosturana, or slender oneseed juniper, is a species of conifer in the family Cupressaceae.

Distribution
The tree is endemic to north-eastern Mexico. It is found in habitats of the Sierra Madre Oriental range, within the states of Coahuila, Hidalgo, Nuevo León, Queretaro, San Luis Potosí, and Tamaulipas.

Data are lacking to estimate rates of decline, both in the past and for the future, but a continuing decline is inferred from the situation that much of the population of Juniperus angosturana occurs on land that is increasingly under pressure from grazing livestock.

See also

References

External links
IUCN Red List of Threatened Species website

angosturana
Endemic flora of Mexico
Trees of Northeastern Mexico
Flora of Coahuila
Flora of Hidalgo (state)
Flora of Nuevo León
Flora of Querétaro
Flora of San Luis Potosí
Flora of Tamaulipas
Flora of the Sierra Madre Oriental
Least concern plants
Taxonomy articles created by Polbot